Christopher Javaughn Alexis Jr. (born 1 May 1996) is a Grenadian road cyclist who is the 2016 Grenada Cycling Federation’s (GCF) National Cycling Champion.

Career achievements

Results 2017

International Races
2nd — SCCCC Season Standings — Collegiate Cat C 
1st — SCCCC Championships Omnium — Collegiate Cat D – New Orleans, LA 
1st — SCCCC Championships Crit — Collegiate Cat C – New Orleans, LA
4th — SCCCC Championships Road Race — Collegiate Cat D – New Orleans, LA
4th — SCCCC Championships ITT — Collegiate Cat C – New Orleans, LA
5th — Veulta del Viento Crit — Collegiate Cat C – Wichita Falls, TX
9th — Veulta del Viento ITT — Collegiate Cat C – Wichita Falls, TX
7th — Veulta del Viento Road Race — Collegiate Cat C – Wichita Falls, TX
8th — Aggieland Omnium — Collegiate Cat C – College Station, TX
9th — Aggieland Omnium ITT — Collegiate Cat C – College Station, TX
7th — Aggieland Omnium Road Race — Collegiate Cat C – College Station, TX
4th — Rice University Omnium — Collegiate Cat C – Houston, TX
3rd — Rice University Crit — Collegiate Cat C – Houston, TX
15th — Rice University ITT — Collegiate Cat C – Houston, TX
4th — Rice University Road Race — Collegiate Cat C – Houston, TX
25th — Arkansas Classic Omnium — Collegiate Cat C – Fayetteville, AR
25th — Arkansas Classic Crit — Collegiate Cat C – Fayetteville, AR
23rd — Arkansas Classic ITT — Collegiate Cat C – Fayetteville, AR
21st — Arkansas Classic Road Race — Collegiate Cat C – Fayetteville, AR 
1st — Louisiana State University Omnium — Collegiate Cat D – Baton Rouge, LA 
2nd — Louisiana State University Road Race — Collegiate Cat D – Baton Rouge, LA 
3rd — Louisiana State University ITT — Collegiate Cat D – Baton Rouge, LA  
1st — Louisiana State University Crit — Collegiate Cat D – Baton Rouge, LA 
13th — Texas State University Road Race — Collegiate Cat D – San Marcos, TX 
9th — Texas State University ITT — Collegiate Cat D – San Marcos, TX 
5th — Texas State University Crit — Collegiate Cat D – San Marcos, TX

Results 2016

Regional Races
2nd — Tobago International Cycling Classic Stage 1 — Division 2 Elite Category — Tobago 
9th — Tobago International Cycling Classic Stage 2 — Division 2 Elite Category — Tobago 
10th — Tobago International Cycling Classic Stage 3 — Division 2 Elite Category — Tobago 
2nd — Tobago International Cycling Classic Stage 4 — Division 2 Elite Category — Tobago 
4th — Tobago International Cycling Classic — Division 2 Elite Overall — Tobago 
DNF — Digicel Breast Cancer Awareness Cycle Race 2016 — Elite Category — Guyana 
27th — GCF/NSC Three Stage Event Stage 1 Road Race — Elite Category — Guyana 
25th — GCF/NSC Three Stage Event Stage 2 Time Trial — Elite Category — Guyana 
12th — GCF/NSC Three Stage Event Stage 3 Circuit Race — Elite Category — Guyana 
23rd — GCF/NSC Three Stage Event Stage 3 Circuit Race — Elite Overall Category — Guyana

Local Races
3rd— TRY Sports & Fitness Hill Time Trial Series Race #1 — Elite Men — Grenada 
6th — TRY Sports & Fitness Hill Time Trial Series Race #2 — Elite Men — Grenada 
6th— TRY Sports & Fitness Hill Time Trial Series Race #3 — Elite Men — Grenada 
1st — GCF 50 Miles Road Race — Elite Men — Grenada 
1st — National Road Race Championships — Elite Category — Grenada

Results 2015

Regional Races
24th — John T Memorial Road Race — Elite Category — Anguilla

International Races
20th — Mangoseed Restaurant W.S United Graveyard — Cat 4– Brooklyn, NY  
17th — Mangoseed Restaurant W.S United Graveyard — Cat 4– Brooklyn, NY 
1st — Major Taylor Iron Riders New Hope Road Race — Open – Newark, NJ

Local Races
1st — GCF 45 Miles Road Race — Elite Men — Grenada 
2nd — Dreams Promotion Road Race – Elite Men- Grenada 
1st — GCF 50 Miles Road Race — Elite Men — Grenada 
3rd — GCF 20 Miles Criterium — Elite Men — Grenada Results 2014 Regional Races

Results 2014

Regional Races
24th — Caribbean Junior Cycling Championships — Junior Category — Paramaribo, Suriname

Local Races
1st — GCF 20 Miles Criterium — Elite Men — Grenada 
1st — GCF 25 Miles Criterium — Junior Category — Grenada 
1st — National Time Trial Championships — Junior Category — Grenada
1st — National Road Race Championships — Junior Category — Grenada  
3rd — National Time Trial Championships — Elite Category — Grenada 
2nd — National Road Race Championships — Elite Category — Grenada 
1st — Grand Etang Challenge — Junior Category — Grenada  
3rd — Grand Etang Challenge — Elite Category — Grenada Results 2011

Results 2011
1st — Dreams Promotion Road Race – Junior Category- Grenada  
2nd — Green’s Bicycle Criterium Race — Junior Category — Grenada 
3rd — Green’s Bicycle Road Race — Elite Junior Category — Grenada

Results 2010
1st — OECS Cycling Championships — Junior Category — Grenada 
1st — Green’s Bicycle Criterium Race — Junior Category — Grenada 
3rd — Green’s Bicycle Criterium Race — Elite Junior Category — Grenada 
1st — National Time Trial Championships — Junior Category — Grenada 
1st — National Road Race Championships — Junior Category — Grenada 
1st — National Criterium Championships — Junior Category — Grenada

National Awards
National Junior Time Trial Champion 2010 
National Junior Criterium Champion 2010 
National Junior Road Race Champion 2010 
Grand Etang Challenge Junior Champion 2014
National Junior Time Trial Champion 2014
National Junior Road Race Champion 2014
National Elite Road Race Champion 2016

References

External links
Christopher Alexis Jr's race history

1996 births
Living people
Grenadian male cyclists